The Killigans are a punk-folk band from Lincoln, Nebraska.  Formed in 2004 following a restructuring of the former local Nebraska ska-punk band Settle for Less, they play a mix of punk, rock, folk, Americana, country, Celtic and Eastern European inspired music.  Their song "Lessons from the Empty Glass" was featured in the 2010 Ridley Scott film Robin Hood. They have released 5 full length albums, 2 EPs, and are well known for their rendition of University of Nebraska's football team's fight song "Come a Runnin Boys/The Cornhusker" which is played in Memorial Stadium.

References 

Nebraska Cornhuskers football
Celtic punk groups
Musical groups from Nebraska